Kamran Shazad (born 25 August 1980) is a Pakistani-born cricketer who played for the United Arab Emirates national cricket team. He made his Twenty20 International debut for the United Arab Emirates against the Netherlands on 17 March 2014 and his One Day International debut against Scotland on 1 February 2014.

References

External links
 

1980 births
Living people
Emirati cricketers
United Arab Emirates One Day International cricketers
United Arab Emirates Twenty20 International cricketers
Cricketers from Islamabad
Pakistani emigrants to the United Arab Emirates
Pakistani expatriate sportspeople in the United Arab Emirates